The North Wessex Downs Area of Outstanding Natural Beauty (AONB) is located in the English counties of Berkshire, Hampshire, Oxfordshire and Wiltshire. The name North Wessex Downs is not a traditional one, the area covered being better known by various overlapping local names, including the Berkshire Downs, the North Hampshire Downs, the White Horse Hills, the Lambourn Downs, the Marlborough Downs, the Vale of Pewsey and Savernake Forest.

Topography 
It takes the form of a horseshoe, with the open end facing east, surrounding the town of Newbury and the River Kennet catchment area. The northern arm reaches as far east as the suburbs of Reading in mid-Berkshire and as far north as Didcot in South Oxfordshire, whilst the southern arm extends to Basingstoke in northern Hampshire. To the west, the AONB reaches as far as Calne and Devizes. The highest points are the 297 m (974 ft) summit of Walbury Hill, situated southeast of Hungerford in West Berkshire (and the highest point in southern England east of the Mendip Hills), and the Milk Hill-Tan Hill plateau northeast of Devizes in central Wiltshire, at 295 m (968 ft) above sea level.

At its northeast extreme, Lardon Chase within the North Wessex Downs AONB faces across the Goring Gap to the Chilterns AONB on the other side of the River Thames. From here working anti-clockwise around the horseshoe, the Berkshire Downs have a steep scarp slope facing north over the Vale of White Horse and a gentler dip slope facing south into the valley of the Kennet. This area includes the horse-racing village of Lambourn and is hence sometimes known as the Lambourn Downs. Beyond the town of Marlborough the downs (now called the Marlborough Downs) sweep in a semicircle to the south around the headwaters of the River Kennet, with the Vale of Pewsey cutting through these downs carrying the headwaters of the Hampshire River Avon. Here too can be found the wooded area of Savernake Forest. Finally, the highest stretch of the Downs runs east along the Berkshire-Hampshire border on the opposite side of the River Kennet from the Berkshire Downs. Again the scarp slope is to the north (facing down in the valley of the Kennet) and the dip slope is to the south into Hampshire.

Geology and natural history 

The downland is part of the Southern England Chalk Formation which runs from Dorset in the west to Kent in the east and also includes the Dorset Downs, Purbeck Hills, Cranborne Chase, Wiltshire Downs, Salisbury Plain, the Isle of Wight, Chiltern Hills and the North and South Downs.

The area is a site of scientific interest in numerous fields and has an internationally important habitat for early gentian. Geologically, its chalk downs, dry valleys and sarsen outcrops are of note, the last in the area around Marlborough providing material for many of the Neolithic and Bronze Age sites in the area such as Avebury Henge.

Economy 
Horse racing forms a major industry in the area, largely because of the good quality turf that comes with the chalk underlay, and much of upland area is made over to gallops and other training areas. Several of the upland villages, and especially the large village of Lambourn, are home to major racing stables. Other villages with strong horse racing connections include Beckhampton, Kingsclere and West Ilsley. The term steeplechase originated in this area, a steeplechase originally being a race between two villages, navigated by reference to the church steeples visible across the rolling downs.

Literature 

On the south-east arm of the AONB can be found Watership Down where the book Watership Down by Richard Adams is set, to the north of the small market town of Whitchurch, Hampshire.

Significant parts of Jude the Obscure by Thomas Hardy are set on and in the villages connected to the Berkshire Downs.

AONB Council of Partners 
The Area of Outstanding Natural Beauty was designated in 1972. It is managed by a Council of Partners whose members are:
 Local Authorities: Basingstoke and Deane Borough Council, Hampshire County Council, Vale of White Horse District Council, West Berkshire Council, Wiltshire Council,  Oxfordshire County Council, South Oxfordshire District Council, Swindon Borough Council and Test Valley Borough Council
 Representing the interests of nature conservation: Natural England, Hampshire and Isle of Wight Wildlife Trust and Action for the River Kennet
 Representing the interests of the historic environment: Council for British Archaeology and English Heritage
 Representing the interests of farming and rural business: Axis Farming, Country Land and Business Association, Forestry Commission, Government Office for the South East and the National Farmers' Union
 Representing the interests of communities and parishes: Connecting Communities in Berkshire, the Friends of Pang, Kennet and Lambourn Valleys, Whitchurch Town Parish Council and Hungerford Town Council
 Representing the interests of recreation and rural tourism: Friends of the Ridgeway and the Ramblers' Association.

References

External links
North Wessex Downs Area of Outstanding Natural Beauty Website

Hills of Hampshire
Hills of Oxfordshire
Areas of Outstanding Natural Beauty in England
Hills of Berkshire
Hills of Wiltshire
Protected areas established in 1972
Protected areas of Hampshire
Protected areas of Oxfordshire
Protected areas of Berkshire
Protected areas of Wiltshire